Harold Douglas Adams (born January 27, 1943) is a retired United States professional baseball player who played 1 season for the Chicago White Sox of Major League Baseball. He was 26 when he joined the Chicago White Sox on September 8, 1969.

References

Major League Baseball catchers
Chicago White Sox players
Baseball players from Wisconsin
Florida Rookie League White Sox players
People from Grant County, Wisconsin
1943 births
Living people